Bridie Kennedy (born 23 September 1999) is an Australian rules footballer who plays for Sydney in the AFL Women's (AFLW). She previously played for Carlton.

She played junior representative football with the Dandenong Stingrays in the TAC Cup Girls competition where she was a co-winner of the league's best and fairest award in 2017. She also played state league football that year with Cranbourne in the VFL Women's competition and previously played local junior football with Dromana.

Kennedy was drafted by Carlton with their fourth selection and the 36th pick overall in the 2017 AFL Women's draft.

Kennedy re-joined the AFLW in June 2022, when she was signed by expansion club Sydney.

References

External links 

1999 births
Living people
Carlton Football Club (AFLW) players
Australian rules footballers from Victoria (Australia)
Dandenong Stingrays players (NAB League Girls)
Darebin Falcons players
Sydney Swans (AFLW) players